Kevin Richards may refer to:

 Kevin Richards (radio broadcaster), American radio broadcaster
 Kevin Richards (footballer) (born 1981), Bermudian soccer player